Harper Creek is a town in the Sunshine Coast, Queensland hinterland region of Queensland, Australia. The population of Harper Creek is around 400.

Geography
Harper Creek, its namesake, runs through the town. There is also a "Harper Creek Road".

Climate

References

Towns in Queensland
Conondale, Queensland